Lee Joon-suk (born 7 April 2000) is a South Korean professional footballer who plays as a striker for K League 1 side Gimcheon Sangmu.

Club career
Lee made his professional debut for K League 1 side Incheon United just before his 19th birthday on 3 April 2019 against Daegu. He came on as a 71st minute substitute for Stefan Mugoša as Incheon were defeated 3–0.

Career statistics

Club

References

External links
Profile at the Incheon United FC website

2000 births
Living people
South Korean footballers
Association football forwards
Incheon United FC players
K League 1 players